Tyndall Glacier may refer to:

Tyndall Glacier (Chile)
Tyndall Glacier (Colorado), a glacier in Rocky Mountain National Park, Colorado USA
Tyndall Glacier (Alaska)
Tyndall Glacier (New Zealand)